Ikhwan is Islamic militia which played an important role in Saudi Arabia's history.

Ikhwan is an Arabic word meaning "brothers". It may refer to:
Global Ikhwan, a group of companies associated with the Malaysian Al-Arqam sect
Ikhwan (Kashmir), pro-Indian government militia in Kashmir
Muslim Brotherhood (Al-Ikhwān al-Muslimūn), political opposition movement in many Arab states
Yihewani, Islamic sect in China (the name is a Chinese transcription of "Ikhwan")
Ikhwan as-Safa wa-Khullan al-Wafa, a secret society of Islamic polymaths in 8th or 10th century CE, Basra, Iraq.

Ikhwan, sometimes spelled Ikwhan, is also a Korean male given name:
Ik-Hwan Bae (1956–2014), South Korean violinist
Moon Ik-hwan (1918–1994), South Korean pastor